Pocket Devil is a Pocket God clone for the iPhone and iPod Touch roughly taking 10 MB.  It was developed, created and distributed by Eyedip LLC, a software company based on the East Coast. Lex Friedman, writing for macworld.com, has called Pocket Devil a "blatant rip-off" of Pocket God.

Built-in features of the iPod touch and iPhone OS 2.2.1 or later are used, such as the accelerometers to simulate gravity which can be used to drop the Mugat2's in a fiery gutter.

Chapters
Pocket Devil is frequently updated with new 'chapters', a themed update that adds new features to the underworld, such as a new area, creatures, or minigames. They have released 20 chapters so far. It also has a sequel called Pocket Devil 2.

References

External links
Pocket Devil review at Gamerswithcasts

2009 video games
God games
IOS games
Video games developed in the United States